Leandro Antonetti López (born 13 January 2003) is a Puerto Rican footballer who plays for Spanish club Polvorín FC. Mainly a forward, he can also play as a winger.

Club career

Youth career
Born in Murcia when his father was playing in Spain, Antonetti began playing football in the Puerto Rican club Caguas Bairoa before moving to Conquistadores de Guaynabo. His impressions at the 2013 MIC Tournament led him to a move to Spanish club ED Xuventude Oroso. In 2019, he was signed by CD Lugo for their academy.

Lugo
In November 2021, Antonetti was called up by Lugo's first team for a Copa del Rey match against AD Unión Adarve, but he was only an unused substitute. On 20 May 2022, after scoring eleven goals for the reserves and helping in their first-ever promotion to the Segunda División RFEF, he made his professional debut with Lugo's first team in the Segunda División, coming on as an 80th-minute substitute for Diego Alende in a 0–1 away loss against Real Zaragoza.

International career
Antonetti made his international debut with Puerto Rico U17 in the 2019 Concacaf Championship under coach Marco Vélez, where he managed to score a goal against Martinique in the first round. In 2021, he was called up for the under-20 team under coach Dave Sarachan for 2021 CONCACAF U-20 Championship qualifying, where he helped Puerto Rico advance to the final round.

Leandro made his senior level debut with the Puerto Rico national football team on 9 June 2022, in a CONCACAF Nations League match against Cayman Island.

Personal life
Antonetti's father Ossie was a professional volleyball player, and is the current head coach of the Puerto Rico men's national volleyball team.

References

External links

2003 births
Living people
Footballers from Murcia
Puerto Rican footballers
Spanish footballers
Spanish people of Puerto Rican descent
Segunda División players
Tercera Federación players
Polvorín FC players
CD Lugo players